A New Voyage Round The World is a 1697 autobiographical book by William Dampier, telling of his journeys around the world, the most celebrated in England being his explorations of Australia. His account is "...notable for the frankness of its account of anarchic, mismanaged and largely unsuccessful buccaneering and merchant enterprise." Following his return to England, Dampier is believed to have written the account in between further, shorter expeditions he made in the following years. It was published in 1697 to success, followed by subsequent editions. One later edition contained an addendum: "A Supplement to the Voyage round the World, together with the Voyages to Campeachy and the Discourse on the Trade Winds". The book helped bring into public consciousness the notion of a southerly continent. The book was also a "major influence on two canonical works of English literature, Swift's Gulliver's Travels and Defoe's Robinson Crusoe". In addition, Charles Darwin quoted Dampier's observations in the book on the behaviour of turtle doves in the Galapagos Islands: "Dampier also, in the same year [1684], says  that a man in a morning's walk might kill six or seven dozen of these doves."

References

1697 books